David James Silva (born 1964) is an American linguist and university administrator. His phonetic, phonological, and sociolinguistic research has examined aspects of the voicing of consonants in Korean and of the vowels of the Portuguese dialect spoken in the Azores.

Biography 
Silva was raised in Medford, Massachusetts. He received his BA in Linguistics from Harvard University in 1986. He earned his MA and Ph.D. in Linguistics from Cornell University, completing his 1992 dissertation under the supervision of John B. Whitman.

Silva was active in the Linguistic Society of America, serving in the 1990s on the Committee of the Status of Women in Linguistics (COSWL). He held positions as Professor, Chair of Linguistics, Vice Provost for Academic Affairs, and Vice Provost for Faculty Affairs at the University of Texas at Arlington. Since 2015 he has served as the Provost and Academic Vice President of Salem State University in Massachusetts.

Awards and distinctions 

Silva did research in Korea by means of a Fulbright Fellowship in 1989 and a Korea Foundation Field Research Fellowship in 2004.

He has taken leadership roles in the national all-discipline honor society of Phi Kappa Phi. Silva was a charter member and first president of Chapter 300 at UT Arlington in 2007, as well as serving nationally as the society’s southwest regional representative. He has served as a columnist on education and academic topics for The Phi Kappa Phi Forum, the society’s quarterly magazine. In 2018 Silva was elected to the national Board of Directors of Phi Kappa Phi as the society's Vice President of Chapter Development.

Linguistics career 
Silva’s work has promoted a better understanding of smaller, non-standard dialect varieties, such as that spoken by Portuguese-American Immigrants from São Miguel. Besides phonological work that inventories the unique vowel set of the São Miguel dialect, Silva’s keynote address at the National Portuguese Honor Society induction at Rhode Island College in 2016 focused on this social responses to the variety. His talk “Every Voice Matters: The Value of Dialect Study in Portuguese Linguistic Research” highlighted negative attitudes expressed towards “Micaelense,” the Portuguese dialect spoken on the São Miguel island of the Azores.

Linguistic publications 
2018. Jin, Wenhua and David J. Silva. "Parallel Voice Onset Time Shift in Chinese Korean." Asia-Pacific Language Variation 3.1:41-66.
2012. Silva, David J. Inquiries Into Korean Linguistics V: Selected Works from the Eighteenth International Conference on Korean Linguistics (ICKL 18) and the Xuzhou Conference on Linguistic Sciences.
2011. Silva, David J., Sharon A. Peters, Fahad Ben Duhaish, Sok-Hun Kim, Yilmin Koo, Lana Marji, and Junsuk Park. “Variation in the Iraq Vowels outside the Public Forum: The Indexing of Political Persuasion Reconsidered.” American Speech 86.2:179-191. 
2011. Silva, David J. “Language, Networks, and Identity in the Azorean Diaspora: One Family’s Sociolinguistic Profile.” Francisco Cota Fagundes, Irene Maria F. Blayer, Teresa F. A. Alves, and Teresa Cid (eds.), Storytelling the Portuguese Diaspora: Piecing Things Together. Currents in Comparative Romance Languages and Literatures, volume 194. New York, NY: Peter Lang Publishing. pp. 187–204. 
2010. Silva, David J. “Death, Taxes, and Language Change: The Inevitable Divergence of Korean Varieties as Spoken Worldwide.” Robert J. Fouser (ed.), Contemporary Korean Linguistics: International Perspectives – In Honor of Professor Sang-Oak Lee. Seoul: Taehaksa. pp. 300–319. 
2008. Edmondson, Jerold A., David J. Silva, and Mary S. Willis. “The impact of anterior dental extraction and restoration on the articulation of affricates by Dinka refugees in Nebraska.” Anthropological Linguistics 50.3-4:365-387. 
2008. Silva, David J. “The Persistence of Stereotyped Dialect Features among Portuguese-American Immigrants from São Miguel, Azores.” Journal of Portuguese Linguistics 7.1:3-21. 
2008. Silva, David J. “Missionary Contributions toward the Revaluation of Hangeul in Late 19th Century Korea.” International Journal of the Sociology of Language 192:57-74. 
2007. Silva, David J. “Issues in Korean Language Teaching in the United States: Recent Facts and Figures.” Korean Language in America 12:106-125. 
2006. Silva, David J. “Acoustic Evidence for the Development of Pitch Accent in Standard Korean.” Phonology 27.2:287-308.
2006. Silva, David J. “Variation among Voice Onset Time Values for Korean Stops: A Case for Recent Sound Change.” Korean Linguistics 13:1-19. 
2005. Silva, David J. “Vowel Shifting as a Marker of Social Identity in the Portuguese Dialect of Nordeste, São Miguel (Azores).” Luso-Brazilian Review 42.1:1- 27. 
2004. Silva, David J. “Quantified Optimality and the Phonological Parsing of Korean SOV Sentences.” Korean Linguistics 12:25-54. 
2004. Silva, David J. “Phonological Mapping as Dynamic: The Evolving Contrastive Relationship between English and Korean.” Linguistic Research (언어연구) 21: 57-74. 
2003. Silva, David J. and Ji Eun Kim. “An Acoustic Study of the American English Pronunciation of Recently Arrived Korean Adult Immigrants.” 어학 연구 (Eohak Yeongu) Language Research 39.3:613-637. 
2002. Silva, David J. “Consonant Aspiration in Korean: A Retrospective.” Sang-Oak Lee and Gregory K. Iverson (eds.), Pathways into Korean Language and Culture: Essays in Honor of Young-Key Kim-Renaud (revised edition). Seoul: Pagijong Press. pp. 447–469. 
2002. Silva, David J. “Western Attitudes toward the Korean Language: An Overview of Late 19th and Early 20th Century Mission Literature.” Korean Studies 26.2:270-286. (appeared in 2003) 
1998. Silva, David J. “Reevaluating Syntax-to-Phonology Mapping in Korean: An Optimality-Acoustic Account.” (Eohak Yeongu) Language Research 34:291-312. 
1998. Silva, David James. “Vowel Elision in São Miguel Portuguese.” Hispania 81:166-178. 
1998. Silva, David James. “The Effects of Prosodic Structure and Consonant Phonation on Vowel FØ in Korean: An Examination of Bilabial Stops.” J.R.P. King and S. Robert Ram.
1997. Silva, David James. “The Variable Deletion of Unstressed Vowels in Azorean Portuguese.” Language Variation and Change 9.3:1-15. 
1991. Silva, David James. “Phonological Variation in Korean: The Case of the ‘Disappearing w’.” Language Variation and Change 3.2:153-170.

References

External links
 –official Twitter page as Provost
 Faculty page
 Google Scholar page: https://scholar.google.com/citations?hl=en&user=qHzfoOYAAAAJ

Living people
1964 births
Linguists from the United States
Harvard University alumni
Cornell University alumni
University of Texas at Arlington faculty